The Battle of Beitang, during the Boxer Rebellion, was fought on September 20, 1900, between the Eight Nation Alliance and the Great Qing army.

Background
It was necessary to capture Beitang for organising railway connection between Tianjin and Manchuria.

During the night, Russian troops captured a Chinese position near the destroyed Beitang railway station, and built several batteries. In the morning, Russian and German cannons began to bombard the fortress, and at 10 a.m. the Chinese garrison fled. At noon, the fortress was captured without fighting.

Notes

Sources
Д.Г.Янчевецкий "У стен недвижного Китая". Санкт-Петербург - Порт-Артур, 1903 (D.G.Yanchevetskiy "Near the Walls of unmoving China", Sankt-Peterburg - Port-Artur, 1903)
В. Г. Дацышен «Русско-китайская война 1900 года. Поход на Пекин» — СПБ, 1999.  (V.G.Datsishen "Russo-chinese war of 1900. March to Beijing", Sankt-Peterburg, 1999)

Battles of the Boxer Rebellion involving the United States
Conflicts in 1900
1900 in China
Battles of the Boxer Rebellion
United States Marine Corps in the 20th century
September 1900 events